Scrupariidae is a family of bryozoans belonging to the order Cheilostomatida.

Genera:
 Brettiopsis López Gappa, 1986
 Scruparia Oken, 1815

References

Bryozoan families